Tri-campus refer to a collection of three campuses of a university.

Campuses of the University of Toronto
Campuses of the University of Washington
Campuses of the University of Notre Dame, Saint Mary's College, and Holy Cross College in Notre Dame, Indiana.